The Golden Bullet can refer to:

 The Golden Bullet (1917 film), a 1917 American film
 The Golden Bullet (1921 film), a 1921 German film